Oldham was, from 1849 to 1974, a local government district in the northwest of England coterminous with the town of Oldham.

History

Improvement Commissioners
Oldham was anciently a township in the large ecclesiastical parish of Prestwich-cum-Oldham. Prior to the 19th century the government of the town was divided between the parish vestry and the county magistrates of Lancashire. In 1828 the Oldham Police Act (7 Geo. IV, cap. 117) established a board of improvement commissioners. All landowners owning property worth more than £50 a year or paying an annual rent of £30 were entitled to become a commissioner. In 1848 there were 360 commissioners.

Municipal Borough
In December 1848 the inhabitant householders of the parliamentary borough of Oldham petitioned the Privy council for a charter of incorporation under the Municipal Corporations Act 1835. The charter was granted on 13 June 1849, and the Municipal Borough of Oldham came into existence on 1 November.

County Borough
Under the Local Government Act 1888 all municipal boroughs with a population of 50,000 or more were designated as "county boroughs" with the powers of both a municipal borough and a county council. In 1889, therefore, the town became the County Borough of Oldham. Although independent of Lancashire County Council, Oldham remained part of the county for certain purposes such as lieutenancy, shrievalty, custos rotulorum and administration of justice. Soon after establishment, the corporation of the county borough promoted a parliamentary bill to extend its boundaries to include four neighbouring local government districts: Chadderton to the west, Crompton to the north, Lees to the east and Royton to the north west. The bill was unsuccessful, and there were only minor boundary adjustments to the borough until the 1950s, while the four surrounding towns became urban districts in their own right in 1894. Despite this, in 1926 and 1931, two Oldham Extension Bills for the County Borough of Oldham to amalgamate with Chadderton Urban District were proposed, but rejected by the House of Lords following objections from neighbouring councils. In 1947 the Local Government Boundary Commission recommended that due to the lack of land for the borough's housing programme that its boundaries should be substantially extended.

The County Borough of Oldham was abolished by the Local Government Act 1972 and its territory transferred to Greater Manchester to form a part of the Metropolitan Borough of Oldham.

Corporation and council
The charter of 1849 divided the borough into eight wards, with each ward represented by three councillors and one alderman, creating a town council of thirty-two members. Councillors had a three-year term of office, with one councillor being elected in each ward annually. Aldermen had a six-year term, with half of their number being elected by the council every three years. The council elected a mayor from their membership to head the council at their annual meeting. In 1886 the number of wards was increased to twelve: Clarksfield, Coldhurst, Hartford, Hollinwood, Mumps, St James, St Mary's, St Paul's, St Peter's, Waterhead, Werneth, and Westwood. The size of the council was accordingly increased to forty-eight. In 1954 the borough was enlarged and in the following year a thirteenth ward of Bardsley was formed, and the council increased to fifty-two members.

Political control
By the 1880s groups aligned with the parliamentary Conservative and Liberal parties contested elections to the borough council. The Liberals (or Radicals) had a majority until 1903, when Conservatives gained control. The elections were fought on Home Rule issues for some years in the early years of the 20th century, with Conservatives supporting Unionism, while Liberals were supported by Roman Catholic organisations. Liberals were in a majority again following World War I, while Labour councillors began to appear on the council. From 1927 the Conservatives and Liberals combined to oppose Labour. In 1931 Conservatives took control, with Labour forming the opposition. In 1934 Labour first took power, and for the next nineteen years the two parties alternated as the majority party. From 1953 to 1968 Labour held the borough, the Conservatives were in power from 1968 to 1971 with Labour regaining control for the last three years of the council's existence.

Coat of arms

Prior to 1894, the town council made use of the arms of the Oldham family. The arms were blazoned as:

Sable a chevron Or between three owls argent on a chief of the second as many roses gules.

The owls suggest that the family, like the town, called itself 'Owdham', and adopted the birds in allusion to its name.  It is possible that the family set the Red Rose of Lancaster on their shield to denote their Lancastrian sympathies. The most famous member of the family to use the arms was Hugh Oldham, Bishop of Exeter, who died in 1519. The arms form part of the insignia of Corpus Christi College, Oxford, founded by the bishop.

The use of the family arms by the corporation was improper, and on 8 November 1894 they received letters patent from the Kings of Arms granting armorial bearings. The arms were based on the family arms, with necessary heraldic differences introduced to the design. The blazon was as follows:

Sable a chevron invected plain cottised Or between three owls argent on a chief engrailed of the second a rose Gules barbed and seeded proper between two annulets also gules, and for a Crest: On a wreath of the colours in front of a rock thereon an owl argent three roses fessewise gules barbed and seeded proper.

The Latin motto adopted was Sapere Aude or "dare to be wise", and was a reference to the owls in the arms.

References

Notes

Bibliography

External links
A vision of Oldham CB/MB, visionofbritain.org.uk.

County borough
Districts of England abolished by the Local Government Act 1972
County borough
County boroughs of England